SV Concordia Königsberg was a German association football club from the city of Königsberg, East Prussia.

History
Established in 1911, the team played two seasons in the Bezirk Königsberg, a city-based circuit that was part of the Gauliga Ostpreußen, one of several top-flight regional divisions in Germany. SV finished fourth in the 1936–37 and 1938–38 campaigns and returned to lower level play in 1938–39 when the Gauliga was reorganized.

The Königsberg club disappeared in 1945 following the end of World War II when the city was annexed by the Soviet Union and renamed Kaliningrad.

References
 Der Fußball in Ostpreußen und Danzig (en: Football in East Prussia and Danzig)
Das deutsche Fußball-Archiv historical German domestic league tables

Football clubs in Germany
Defunct football clubs in Germany
Association football clubs established in 1911
Association football clubs disestablished in 1945
Defunct football clubs in former German territories
Sport in Königsberg